CUJO AI is an American network intelligence software company headquartered in El Segundo, California, United States. It provides cybersecurity and device management software for network operators.

History
CUJO AI was founded in 2015 by Yuri Frayman, and Einaras von Gravrock. In January 2018, the company has launched CUJO AI Platform for network operators and secured and enhanced experiences for 200M Devices. In October 2018, the company received series B investment round from KPN Ventures for further expansion and accelerate growth in the international market.

In 2019 January, CUJO AI has received investment from an American telecommunication giant Charter Communications.

Features
CUJO AI offers a SaaS platform for network operators that helps in identification and restricting malicious activity on the home network. It utilizes algorithms powered by machine learning and allows to precisely identify the devices and creates a personalized experience for the end-user. The company's products are used to block malware, protect the home users from remote access and other threats. It also allows the home users to use filters or block certain websites, or just pages of a website.

In 2021 CUJO AI decided to discontinue their home security firewall device named CUJO despite selling “lifetime” licenses and despite stating they would maintain the “lifetime” license in 2019  In return, users got a $250 paper weight. 

In 2019, Comcast launched a digital security service called "Xfinity xFi Advanced Security", which was developed by CUJO AI.

Awards and recognition
 The Most Innovative Security Strategy award 2019
Vendor to Watch by the Gartner, 2018
Glotel, Security Solution of the Year, 2018
Vodafone IoT challenge 2017 Runner-up

References

External links 

Companies based in El Segundo, California